Gennadiy Mykhailovych Feldman (born October 15, 1947) is a Soviet and Ukrainian mathematician, corresponding member of the National Academy of Sciences of Ukraine, Doctor of Science in Physics and Mathematics, Professor, Head of the Mathematical Division of B. Verkin  Institute for Low Temperature Physics and Engineering of the National Academy of Sciences  of Ukraine.

Biography
In 1970, Feldman graduated in the Faculty of Mechanics and Mathematics of V.N. Karazin  Kharkiv National University. From 1970 to 1973, he was a PhD student at B. Verkin  Institute for Low Temperature Physics and Engineering. In 1973, he defended his thesis Harmonic Analysis of Non-unitary Representations of  Locally Compact Abelian Groups (supervisor  Prof. Yu. I. Lyubich). He has been working at B. Verkin  Institute for Low Temperature Physics and Engineering, starting as a junior researcher and heading the Mathematical Division in 2012. In 1985, he defended his doctoral thesis, Arithmetic of Probability Measures on Locally Compact Abelian groups at Vilnius University. In 2018, he was elected as a corresponding member of the National Academy of Sciences of Ukraine. For more than 20 years, Feldman worked part-time at the Faculty of Mechanics and Mathematics of V.N. Karazin Kharkiv National University. He is the author of four monographs and more than 100 scientific articles.

Feldman specializes in the field of abstract harmonic analysis and algebraic probability theory. He constructed a theory of decompositions of random variables and proved analogs of the classical characterization theorems of mathematical statistics in the case  when  random variables take values in various classes of locally compact Abelian groups (discrete, compact, and others).

Awards 
 Ostrogradsky prize of the National Academy of Sciences  of Ukraine  (2009) for the series of works “Probabilistic Problems on Groups and in Spectral Theory” (together with L. Pastur and M. Shcherbina).

 State Prize of Ukraine in Science and Technology (2018)  for the   work  «Qualitative methods of research models of mathematical physics» (together with A. Kochubey, M. Shcherbina, O. Rebenko, I. Mykytyuk, V. Samojlenko, A. Prykarpatskyj).

 Mitropolskiy prize of the National Academy of Sciences  of Ukraine  (2021)  for the series of works “New analytical methods in the theory of nonlinear oscillations, the theory of random matrices and in characterization problems” (together with V. Slyusarchuk and M. Shcherbina).

Monographs 
 Г. М. Фельдман. Арифметика вероятностных распределений и характеризационные задачи на абелевых группах, Киев: Наукова думка, 1990, 168 с.
 G.M. Fel'dman. Arithmetic of probability distributions, and characterization problems on Abelian groups, Transl. Math. Monographs. Vol. 116, Providence, RI: American Mathematical Society, 1993, 223 p. 
 Gennadiy Feldman. Functional equations and characterization problems on locally compact Abelian groups, EMS Tracts in Mathematics 5, Zurich: European Mathematical Society, 2008, 268 p. 
 Г. М. Фельдман. Характеризационные задачи математической статистики на локально компактных абелевых группах, Киев: Наукова думка, 2010, 432 с.

Information sources 
 Web page on B. Verkin Institute for Low Temperature Physics and Engineering of the National Academy of Sciences of Ukraine
 Web page on the National Academy of Sciences of Ukraine
 Web page on Math-Net.Ru
 Article on the occasion of the sixtieth anniversary
 75th anniversary of Corresponding Member of the NAS of Ukraine G.M. Feldman

References 

Ukrainian mathematicians
National University of Kharkiv alumni
1947 births
Living people
Laureates of the State Prize of Ukraine in Science and Technology